Addatimes is an Indian on-demand video streaming platform, owned and maintained by Addatimes Media Private Limited, launched on 15 June 2016.

Content 
Addatimes has offerings catering specifically to the Bengali audience by creating Original Web Series, Short Films, Bengali Video songs, Short Love Story, Detective Movies, thriller and suspense drama, comedy web series and more. Currently, it has 57 movies, 29 web series, and 38 Short Films.

In India, Addatimes has both the ad-supported model and paid-subscription. In Bangladesh, the service is under paid-subscription only.

Releases

Web-series

Films

References

Indian companies established in 2016
Internet properties established in 2016
Video on demand services
2016 establishments in West Bengal
Companies based in Kolkata